Michael G. Vann (born June 19, 1967) is an American historian who serves as Professor of History at California State University, Sacramento. He teaches a range of world history courses, including 20th century world, Southeast Asia, imperialism, and genocide. His research specializes in the history of the French colonial empire, epidemic diseases such as the Third Bubonic Plague Pandemic, and Cold War era mass violence in Southeast Asia. Vann holds a Ph.D. in History from the University of California, Santa Cruz, where he was a student of Tyler Stovall and Edmund Burke III. His dissertation was on the history of white supremacy in French colonial Hanoi. He is a graduate of 'Iolani School in Honolulu, Hawai'i, his home town.

Accomplishments
Vann has won three Fulbright awards, one for doctoral research in France, 1994–1995, and a Senior Scholar award to Indonesia, 2012–2013, and a third as a Senior Scholar in Cambodia where he taught history and did research on representations of Cold War era mass violence in Cambodian, Vietnamese, and Indonesian museums. In Indonesia he was a visiting scholar for the History and American Studies departments at Universitas Gadjah Mada in Yogyakarta, Java.

He was president of the French Colonial Historical Society (FCHS) from 2008 to 2010. He is a member of a post-1999 wave of historians who adopted a new critical approach to this history of France and its colonial empire.

Vann has published three books: The Colonial Good Life: André Joyeux's Vision of French Indochina, 20th Century Voices: Selected Readings in World History, and The Great Hanoi Rat Hunt: Empire, Disease, and Modernity in French Colonial Vietnam.
Vann was featured on public radio's Freakonomics, speaking about how his research on rat hunting in colonial Hanoi related to the economic concept "perverse incentive".  He was interviewed about French colonialism on KUSP's 7th Avenue Project.

He has also published articles on Indonesian history and politics, including the Cebongan Prison raid, 2013,  and Lawang Sewu, a Dutch era haunted house in Semarang.

Publications

Books
The Great Hanoi Rat Hunt: Empire, Race, and Modernity in French Colonial Vietnam. Oxford University Press, New York, 2018. (Author)

Instructor's Manual, Ways of the World: A Brief Global History with Sources. 3rd Edition. Bedford/St.Martin's, 2016. (Author)

The Norton Mix: Readings in World and Regional History. W.W. Norton, New York, 2016. (Co-Author and Co-Editor)

Twentieth Century Voices: Selected Readings in World History. Cognella, San Diego, 2012. (Author and Editor)

“The Colonial Good Life:” A Commentary on Andre Joyeux's Vision of French Indochina. White Lotus Press, Bangkok, 2008. (Author and Translator)

Film
"Cambodia's Other Lost City: French Colonial Phnom Penh". Writer and Host. 2014. Jeffrey Dym, director. YouTube

Edited Volumes
“WHAB Focus Issue and Teaching Forum. Making French Connections: France in World History.” Guest Editor with Alyssa Sepinwall. World History Association Bulletin Vol. XXVI, No. 1, 2010.

Articles, Book Chapters, and Pamphlets
“A People's History of Surfing” co-authored with Trey Highton. Jacobin, 2022. Jacobin

“Suharto's Old Guard Is Still Calling the Shots in Indonesia”. Jacobin, 2022. Jacobin

“Suharto's US-Backed Coup in Indonesia Supplied a Template for Worldwide Mass Murder”. Jacobin, 2022. Jacobin

“Tyler Stovall Was a Groundbreaking Historian of Modern France”. Jacobin, 2021. Jacobin

“Indonesia Still Hasn't Escaped Suharto's Genocidal Legacy”. Jacobin, 2021. Jacobin

“French Urbanism, Vietnamese Resistance, and the Plague in Hanoi, Vietnam, 1885-1930s”, Edidted by Mohammad Gharipour and Caitlin DeClercq, Epidemic Urbanism: How Contagious Diseases Have Shaped Global Cities. Intellect Books, 2021.

“The True Story of Indonesia's US-Backed Anti-Communist Bloodbath”. Jacobin, 2021. Jacobin

“Teaching Pandemic History During a Pandemic Present”. Kyoto Review of Southeast Asia, special issue “Pandemic Pedagogy: Reflections on teaching in times of global disruption”, 2021. Kyoto Review

“Alexandre Yersin: Plague Conqueror and White Colonizer”. Fiction and Film for French Scholars, Volume 11, Issue 1, October 2020. Fiction and Film for Scholars of France

“Colonial Sewers Led to More Rats”. Feral Atlas, Stanford University Press Digital, 2020. Feral Atlas

“Microsyllabus: Histories of Epidemic Disease”. The Abusable Past, 2020. The Abusable Past

“‘And not just the men, but the women and the children, too’: Gendered Images of Violence in Indonesian, Vietnamese, and Cambodian Cold War Museums.” Suvannabhumi: Multi-disciplinary Journal of Southeast Asian Studies, Volume 12, Number 1, 2020.

“Tropical Cold War Horror: Penumpasan Pengkhianatan G30S/PKI and the Traumatized Culture of Suharto's New Order.” Poshek Fu and Man-Fung Yip, The Cold War and Asian Cinemas (Routledge), 2020.

“Murder, Museums, and Memory: Cold War Public History in Jakarta, Ho Chi Minh City, and Phnom Penh.” Frank Jacob (ed.), Genocide and Mass Violence in Asia: An Introductory Reader (De Gruyter), 2019.

“Confessions of a Rogue Historian: Why I Wrote a Graphic History of Colonial Hanoi.” Fiction and Film for French Scholars, Volume 9, Issue 3, March 2019. Fiction and Film for Scholars of France

“Book raids, Red-baiting and culture wars in the Indonesian presidential election.” The Asia Dialogue, February 21, 2019. The Asia Dialogue

“Will French History Finally Engage Intersectionality?” in “Race, Racism, and the Study of France and the Francophone World Today.” H-France Salon, Volume 11, Issue 2, 2019. H-France

“Suharto's Shadow Still Lingers in Indonesian Museums.” The Diplomat, February 6, 2019. The Diplomat

“Emotion and ambiguity in the Tuol Sleng Genocide Museum,” The Asia Dialogue, January 8, 2019. The Asia Dialogue

“Jakarta, 1968: The Party's Over.” World History Bulletin special issue on “The Long Global Sixties,” Vol. XXXIV, Nos. 1-2, 2018.

“(Colonial) Intimacy Issues: Using French Hanoi to Teach the Histories of Sex, Racial Hierarchies, and Geographies of Desire in the New Imperialism.” World History Connected, October 2018. World History Connected

“American Historical Presidential Biography: Tyler Stovall.” American Historical Association Presidential Address Booklet, 2018. American Historical Association

“Sex and the Colonial City: Mapping Masculinity, Whiteness, and Desire in French Occupied Hanoi.” Journal of World History, Vol. 28, Nos. 3 & 4, 2017.

“‘Blame it on the Casbah:’ The White Male Imperialist Fantasies of Duvivier's Pépé le Moko.” Fiction and Film for French Historians: A Cultural Bulletin, Vol. 8, Issue 1, 2017. Fiction and Film for Scholars of France

“Société colonial et accomodations: entre réalités et representations” co-authored with Jean-François Klein and Micheline Lessard in Dominique Barjot and Jean-François Klein. De l’Indochine colonial au Việt Nam actuel (Magellan & Cie.), 2017.

“Call Five-O a White Male Imperialist Fantasy: Steve McGarrett as a Vision of American Cold War Masculinity, Race, and Empire” in Lori McGuire (ed.), Entertainment Television and the Cold War, (Cambridge Scholars), 2016.

“Paris–Dakar in Reverse: Colonial and Post-Colonial Urban Histories, Roundtable Reflection on the Past and Future of French Urban History.” Co-authored by Ellen Wurtzel, Jeff Horn, Catherine Clark, and Michael G. Vann, Proceedings of the Western Society for French History, 2016.

“Comparative History of Genocide in Southeast Asia: Using Cambodia and East Timor in Asian Civilizations and World History Survey Courses.” Education About Asia, Vol. 20, No. 1, 2015.

“When the World Came to Southeast Asia: Malacca and the Global Economy.” Education About Asia, Vol. 19, No. 2, 2014.

“Haunted house, haunted history: Visitors to Semarang's Lawang Sewu find competing narratives of history, memory and popular culture.” Inside Indonesia, July 1, 2013. Inside Indonesia 
“Shadow Puppets and Special Forces: Indonesia's Fragile Democracy.” The Diplomat, June 14, 2013. The Diplomat

“Hanoi in the Time of Cholera: Epidemic Disease and Racial Power in the Colonial City” in Laurence Monnais and Harold J. Cook (eds.), Global Movements, Local Concerns: Medicine and Health in Southeast Asia (National University Singapore Press), 2012.

“The Dark Side: French Men Becoming Monsters in Algeria.” French and Film forFrench Historians: A Cultural Bulletin, Vol. 3, Issue 1, 2012. Fiction and Film for Scholars of France

“Fear and Loathing in French Hanoi: Colonial White Images and Imaginings of ‘Native’ Violence” in Martin Thomas (ed.) The French Colonial Mind: Violence, Military Encounters, and Colonialism (University of Nebraska Press), 2011.

“Teaching Colonialism in World History: The Case of French Indochina.” World History Bulletin, Vol. XXVI, No. 1, 2010.

“Of Pirates, Postcards, and Public Beheadings: The Pedagogical Execution in French Colonial Indochina” in a special issue of Historical Reflections/Réflexions Historiques dedicated to colonial violence in the French empire, 2010.

“Placing East Timor on the Syllabus: Pedagogical Strategies for Teaching East Timor in University Level World History Survey Courses” in Michael Leach, Nuno Canas Mendes, Antero B. da Silva, Alarico da Costa Ximenes and Bob Boughto (eds.), Hatene kona ba/ Compreender/ Understanding/ Mengerti Timor-Leste (Swinburne Press), 2010.

“Caricaturing 'the colonial good life' in French Indochina.” European Comic Art, Vol. 1, No. 2, 2009.

“Building Whiteness on the Red River: Race, Power, and Urbanism in Paul Doumer's Hanoi, 1897-1902” in a special issue of Historical Reflections/Réflexions Historiques dedicated to French colonial urbanism, 2007.

“White Blood on Rue Hue: The Murder of ‘le négrier’ Bazin.” The Proceedings of the Western Society for French History Vol. 34, 2006.

“Of le Cafard and Other Tropical Diseases: Perceived Threats to White Colonial Culture in Indochina” in Jennifer Yee (ed.), France and ‘Indochina:’ Cultural Representations (Lexington), 2005.

“‘All the World's a Stage’, Especially in the Colonies: The Hanoi Exposition of 1902” in Martin Evans & Amanda Sackur (ed.), Empire and Culture: The French Experience, 1830-1940 (Macmillan/Palgrave Press), 2004.

“The Third Republic and Colonialism, 1870-1918.” 2004.

“The Colonial Exhibition of May, 1931.” 2004.

“Of Rats, Rice, and Race: The Great Hanoi Rat Massacre, an Episode in French Colonial History.” French Colonial History, 2003.

“The Good, the Bad, and The Ugly: Variation and Difference in French Racial Thinking in Colonial Vietnam” in Tyler Stovall & Sue Peabody (ed.), The Color of Liberty: The History of Race in France (Duke University Press), 2003.

“The Colonial Casbah on the Silver Screen: Using Pépé le Moko and The Battle of Algiers to Teach Colonialism, Race, and Globalization in French History.” Radical History Review, April 2002.

“The Good, the Bad, and The Ugly: Variation and Difference in French Racial Thinking in Colonial Indochine.” Proceedings of the Western Society for French History, 1998. Winner of the Gargan Prize.

“Contesting Culture and Defying Dependency: Migration, Nationalism, and Identity in Late-Nineteenth-Century Hawaii.” Stanford Humanities Review, Vol. 5, No. 2, 1997.

Podcasting and Radio

New Books in History
Vann has been a host for New Books in History, a channel on the New Books Network, since 2019. His guests have ranged from Pulitzer Prize winner and MacArthur "Genius Grant" recipient Viet Thanh Nguyen to dirtbag left podcaster Matt Christman of Chapo Trap House.

Guest Appearances
Vann has also been interviewed on many programs regarding his work.

Athletic achievements

Hailing from O'ahu, Hawai'i, Vann is an accomplished surfer who frequently travels to Indonesia. He holds a 4th degree black belt in Brazilian Jiu Jitsu. He has taught Brazilian Jiu Jitsu in Santa Cruz, California for Claudio França BJJ, Kaijin MMA, and Garth Taylor Jiu-Jitsu. He also taught Brazilian Jiu Jitsu at Hanoi BJJ in Vietnam and Kingdom Fight Gym in Siem Reap, Cambodia.

References

External links
Vann's profile at CSUS
Frenchcolonial.org

1967 births
Living people
21st-century American historians
21st-century American male writers
Historians of colonialism
University of California, Santa Cruz alumni
California State University, Sacramento faculty
American male non-fiction writers